The Fernseh AG television company was registered in Berlin on July 3, 1929, by John Logie Baird, Robert Bosch, Zeiss Ikon and D.S. Loewe as partners. John Baird owned Baird Television Ltd. in London, Zeiss Ikon was a camera company in Dresden, D.S. Loewe owned a company in Berlin and Robert Bosch owned a company, Robert Bosch GmbH, in Stuttgart. with an initial capital of 100,000 Reichsmark. Fernseh AG did research and manufacturing of television equipment.

Etymology
The company name "Fernseh AG" is a compound of Fernsehen ‘television’ and Aktiengesellschaft (AG) ‘joint-stock company’. The company was mainly known by its German abbreviation "FESE". See section see also on this page for other uses.

Early years
In 1929 Fernseh AG's original board of directors included: Emanuel Goldberg, Oliver George Hutchinson (for Baird), David Ludwig Loewe, and Erich Carl Rassbach (for Bosch) and Eberhard Falkenstein who did the legal work.
Carl Zeiss's company worked alongside the early Bosch company. Much of the early work was in the area of research and development. Along with early TV sets (DE-6, E1, DE10) Fernseh AG made the first "Remote Truck"/"OB van", an "intermediate-film" mobile television camera in August 1932. This was a film camera that had its film developed in the truck and a "telecine" then transmitted the signal almost "live".

Fernseh GmbH
In 1939 Robert Bosch GmbH took complete ownership of Fernseh AG when Zeiss Ikon AG sold its share of Fernseh AG.
In 1952 Fernseh moved to Darmstadt, Germany, and increased its broadcast product line.
In 1967 Fernseh, by then commonly called "Bosch Fernseh", introduced color TV products. Fernseh offered a full line of video and film equipment: professional video cameras, VTRs and telecine devices. On August 27, 1967, the first color TV program in Germany aired, with a live broadcast from a Bosch Fernseh outside broadcast (OB) van. The networks ZDF, NDR and WDR each acquired a new color OB van from Bosch Fernseh to begin broadcasting in color.

Fernsehanlagen GmbH
In 1972 Robert Bosch renamed its TV division: Fernsehanlagen GmbH (Fernseh facilities). The company supplied almost all the studio equipment for the 1972 Summer Olympics in Munich. The Darmstadt HQ had over 2000 employees in 1972. In 1972 Fernseh started to manufacture SECAM TV studio equipment for Moscow.

Fernseh Inc.
In October 1979 Bell and Howell's TeleMation Inc. Division located in Salt Lake City, Utah, entered a joint venture with Robert Bosch GmbH,  Bosch's Fernseh Division. The new joint venture was call Fernseh Inc.,  Bosch Fernseh Division was located in Darmstadt, Germany
In April 1982 Bosch fully acquired Fernseh Inc., renaming it "Robert Bosch Corporation, Fernseh Division"
In 1986 Bosch entered into a new joint venture with Philips Broadcast in Breda, Netherlands. This new company was called Broadcast Television Systems or BTS inc. Philips had been in the Broadcast market for many years with a line of PC- and LDK- Norelco professional video cameras and other video products.
In 1995 Philips Electronics North America Corp. fully acquired BTS Inc., renaming it Philips Broadcast-Philips Digital Video Systems. Philips sold many of the Spirit DataCines.
In March 2001 this Philips division was sold to Thomson SA, the Division was call Thomson Multimedia. In 2002, the French electronics giant Thomson SA also acquired the Grass Valley Group from a private investor that had acquired it three years earlier from Tektronix in Beaverton, Oregon, USA. The current name of this division of Thomson is Grass Valley.  The Fernseh's Darmstadt factory, near the Darmstadt Train Station and European Space Operations Centre was moved a short distance to Weiterstadt, Germany. (Later, Grass Valley was sold to Belden on February 6, 2014. Belden also owns Miranda.)
Thomson Film Division, located in Weiterstadt including the product line of Spirit DataCine4k, Bones Work station, Scanity realtime film scanner and LUTher 3D Color Space converter, was sold to Parter Capital Group.  The sale was made public on Sept. 9, 2008 and completed on Dec. 1, 2008. The new Headquarters was still in Weiterstadt, the former Bosch Fernseh — BTS factory. Parter Capital Group continued to have worldwide offices to support products from Weiterstadt, Germany. The new name of the company is Digital Film Technology.  DFT Digital Film Technology became part of a new company: Precision Mechatronics GmbH in Weiterstadt, Germany. On October 1, 2012 Precision Mechatronics and DFT were acquired by Prasad Group, part of Prasad Studios. In 2013 DFT moved from Weiterstadt to Arheilgen-Darmstadt, Germany.

Products

Home Television sets (later moved to the Blaupunkt Division) (1930- )
Home Radios (later moved to the Blaupunkt Division) (1930- )
Vacuum tubeTube tester
Early mechanical Camera for Mechanical television 1938, "Universal mechanical scanner"
Intermediate film system for Remote Truck (1936)
"Farvimeter" a universal electrical testing device (1947)
"Farvigraph" a universal Oscilloscope (1949)
 Slide scanner for station ID and test patterns (1955)
Filmgeber Film Chain F16LP15 Analog
Fernseh Theater TV system, 1935
TV transmitter 1944
Master control, B&W Video switcher
 Sound recorder — player, Diaabtaster DAT15, Fernseh
B & W Film Chain
OMY Color Film Chain - Analog
BCM-40 and B&W BM-20 2 inch Quadruplex videotape 1966-70s
B & W cameras like Videokamera s/w K11 VK9 HA
 M series monitors
TV Oscilloscope
Video-signal generators
Television standards conversion(1970s) Analog Model NC 56 P 40, with Plumbicon tube camera inside.

 Transcoder to convert PAL to SECAM and SECAM to PAl. (1972)
BCR pre BCN VTR
BCN series 1 inch type B videotape (1979–1989) Analog VTR
KC series color professional video camera KCU-40, KCR, KCK-40, KCK-R-40, KCP-40, KCP-60, KCA, KCF-1, KCM-125, KCA, KCN92, KCN(1967–1990),
Color film chain, with KCU-40 camera
MC series color and B&WVideo monitorMC-37, MC-50 MCH 51, MH 21
OB Van - TV Remote Trucks - and Terminal Rack Equipment
RME series Mixers — Switcher - Vision mixer, Analog
FDL-60 Telecine - The world's first CCD telecine (1979–1989)
FRP-60 Color Corrector-Color grading (1983–1989)
FDL-90 Telecine (1989–1993) (now under BTS)
Noise/Grain Reducer: FDGR, DNR7, MNR9, MNR10, MNR11, VS4, Scream, Scream 4k
KCA-110 ENG Camera
KCF-1 ENG Camera  (later Quartercam, not sold)
CCIR 601 Products CD7, DC7, 4X4 Booster, Test Gen. Encoders, Decoders.
DD series CCIR 601-D1 Mixers - Vision mixer DD5, DD10, DD20, DD30
DCR series D1 VTR DCR-100 DCR-300 DCR-500
BCH 1000 HDTV 1" VTR
KCH 1000 HDTV camera   (RMH 1000)
FLH 1000 Telecine The world's first HDTV CCD Telecine (1994–1996)
Quadra 4:4:4 Telecine (1993–1998)
D6 HDTV VTR Uncompressed HDTV VTR (VooDoo)-(Gigabit Data Recorder (2000–2006) (Now under Philips)
Spirit DataCine Motion picture film scanner and HDTV Telecine SDC-2000 (1996–2006) also: SDC2001, SDC2002
Phantom Transfer Engine Software for Spirit Datacine Telecine for Virtual telecine(1998-)
Shadow HDTV Telecine STE (2000–2006)
VDC-2000 Specter Virtual telecine (1999–2002)
Specter FS Virtual telecine (2002–2006)
Spirit DataCine 4k Datacine - Telecine (2004-2014) also Spirit Spirit 2k/Spirit-HD (now Under Thomson-Grassvalley)
Bones Linux-Based Software for Spirit Datacine Telecine Transfer Engine Software (2005-2014 )
Bones Dailies (2008-2014)
LUTher 3D LUT Color Space (2005-2013)
 Flexxity (2011-2014)
 Scanity film scanner (2009- ) (Now under DFT)
 Phantom 2: Linux-Based transfer Engine software and workstation for Spirit Datacine (2014-) (Now under DFT)

Photo gallery

Offices
Past and current offices in the cities of acquisitions (see History):
 Cergy, France (Thomson World Headquarters)
 Salt Lake City, Utah, United States - from TeleMation Inc -Bell and Howell
 Beaverton, Oregon, United States- from Tektronix
 Nevada City, California, United States — from Grassvalley Group
 Breda, Netherlands - from Philips - Norelco
 Weiterstadt - Darmstadt, Germany from Bosch Fernseh-(DFT),
 In 2013 DFT moved from Weiterstadt to Arheilgen-Darmstadt, Germany.

See also

Hans Walz
Post-production
Professional video camera
Telecine
TV
Video camera
Fernseh prefix:
Fernsehturm Berlin Television Tower.
Fernsehen, German word for "television".
Fernseh sprechstellen German Videotelephony.
Fernsehturm Stuttgart  telecommunications tower in Stuttgart.
Fernsehsender Paul Nipkow first public television station in the world.
Fernsehturm (disambiguation) German word for television tower.
Fernsehen der DDR  state television broadcaster in East Germany.
Fernsehturm Heidelberg Heidelberg transmission tower.
Fernsehturm Dresden-Wachwitz  TV tower in Dresden.
Fernsehserien German for TV series which comprises several episodes.
ZDF Fernsehgarten "ZDF Television garden" is a German entertainment show.
Deutscher Fernseh-Rundfunk Early German Television Broadcasting
Fernsehproduktion a television production.
Fernsehnorm TV standard.
Fernsehpitaval Crime TV show from 1958 to 1978 on GDR.

References and notes

External links
History of Bosch Fernseh
Bosch.com History
Film Products
Early Fernseh TV set
Early Camera
BCN Pictures
Fernseh mechanical TVs
Deutsches Fernsehmuseum - German TV Museum

Mass media companies of Germany
Film and video technology
Cameras
Video storage
Film production
Television technology
Video hardware
Technicolor SA